Cold Ash Quarry is a  geological Site of Special Scientific Interest north of Newbury in Berkshire. It is a Geological Conservation Review site.

The quarry is unique in Britain for the collection of fossil plants and insects which occur in a layer of silt and clay within the Reading Beds. The fossils date to about 60 million years ago. The fossil flora consists of well-preserved angiosperm leaves, in some of these fossils there is evidence of the activity of contemporary leaf-miner insects.  This is the only location in Britain at which fossil leaf-miner activity have been discovered.

The site is private land with no public access.

References

Sites of Special Scientific Interest in Berkshire
Geological Conservation Review sites